Stigmina carpophila (syn. Wilsonomyces carpophilus) is a fungal plant pathogen causing shot hole disease in stone fruits (Prunus spp.).

References

External links 
 Index Fungorum
 USDA ARS Fungal Database
 Coryneum or Shothole Blight. Utah State University Extension fact sheet PLP-008.  2008.

Fungal plant pathogens and diseases
Stone fruit tree diseases
Dothideales
Fungi described in 1959
Taxa named by Joseph-Henri Léveillé